Rhodymenia is a genus of red algae, containing the following species:

Rhodymenia acanthophora Greville
Rhodymenia adnata Okamura
Rhodymenia arborescens E. Y. Dawson
Rhodymenia ardissonei (Kuntze) Feldmann
Rhodymenia caespitosa P. J. L. Dangeard
Rhodymenia californica Kylin
Rhodymenia callophylloides Hollenberg & I. A. Abbott
Rhodymenia capensis J. Agardh
Rhodymenia caulescens (Kützing) A. J. K. Millar
Rhodymenia cinnabarina J. Agardh
Rhodymenia coacta Okamura & Segawa
Rhodymenia coccocarpa (Montagne) M. J. Wynne
Rhodymenia coespitosella L'Hardy-Halos
Rhodymenia corallina (Bory de Saint-Vincent) Greville
Rhodymenia crozetii Levring
Rhodymenia dawsonii Taylor
Rhodymenia decumbens W. R. Taylor
Rhodymenia delicatula P. J. L. Dangeard
Rhodymenia dichotoma J. D. Hooker & Harvey
Rhodymenia dissecta Børgesen
Rhodymenia divaricata E. Y. Dawson
Rhodymenia erythraea Zanardini
Rhodymenia eyreana Papenfuss
Rhodymenia flabellifolia (Bory de Saint-Vincent) Montagne
Rhodymenia gardneri (Setchell) Kylin
Rhodymenia hainanensis B.-M. Xia & Y.-Q. Zhang
Rhodymenia hancockii E. Y. Dawson
Rhodymenia holmesii Ardissone
Rhodymenia howeana E. Y. Dawson
Rhodymenia indica Web. v. Bosse
Rhodymenia intricata (Okamura) Okamura
Rhodymenia javanica Sonder
Rhodymenia lambertii (Turner) Greville ex J. D. Hooker & Harvey
Rhodymenia lanceolata Harvey
Rhodymenia leptofaucheoides P. Huvé & H. Huvé
Rhodymenia leptophylla J. Agardh
Rhodymenia ligulata Zanardini
Rhodymenia linearis J. Agardh
Rhodymenia liniformis Okamura
Rhodymenia lobata E. Y. Dawson
Rhodymenia multidigitata E. Y. Dawson, Acleto & Foldvik
Rhodymenia natalensis Kylin
Rhodymenia novaehollandica G. W. Saunders
Rhodymenia novazelandica E. Y. Dawson
Rhodymenia obtusa (Greville) Womersley
Rhodymenia pacifica Kylin
Rhodymenia palmetta (Stackhouse) Greville
Rhodymenia palmipedata Dawson & Neushel
Rhodymenia parva Yamada
Rhodymenia peruviana J. Agardh
Rhodymenia phylloïdes L'Hardy-Halos
Rhodymenia prolificans Zanardini
Rhodymenia prostrata Tanaka
Rhodymenia pseudopalmata (J. V. Lamouroux) P. C. Silva
Rhodymenia schmittii W. R. Taylor
Rhodymenia setchellii Weber-van Bosse
Rhodymenia skottsbergii E. Y. Dawson
Rhodymenia stenoglossa J. Agardh
Rhodymenia sympodiophyllum E. Y. Dawson & Neushul
Rhodymenia variolosa J. D. Hooker & Harvey
Rhodymenia wilsonis (Sonder) G. W. Saunders

References

Red algae genera
Rhodymeniales